Before I Sleep is a 2013 American drama film co-directed, written and produced by Aaron Sharff and Billy Sharff. The film features David Warner, Tom Sizemore, Bonnie Wright, Cynthia Gibb, Eric Roberts, Eugene Simon, Campbell Scott  and Chevy Chase.  It was formerly titled Shakespeare's Daughter.
The film premiered in competition at the Heartland Film Festival on October 19, 2013. The film marks the final film appearance of James Rebhorn before his death.

Synopsis
Eugene Devlin, a once famous, now reclusive poet, searches through his past, looking for redemption and peace.

Cast
 David Warner as Eugene Devlin
Tanner Flood as Child Eugene Devlin
Eugene Simon as Eugene Devlin (age 20)
Campbell Scott as Eugene Devlin (age 48)
 Tom Sizemore as Randy
 Cynthia Gibb as Caroline
 Eric Roberts as David
 Chevy Chase as The Gravedigger
 Bonnie Wright as Phoebe
Clare Foley as Child Phoebe
 Sasha Spielberg as Rachel
 Jamie Bamber as Paul
 James Rebhorn as Priest
 Alice St. Clair as Zooey
 George Woodard as The Singer
 John Blyth Barrymore as The Pianist
 Rusty DeWees as Nurse
 Caley Chase as Geena
 Daniel Edwin Adams as Parishioner
 Eva Schiffman as Little Girl
 Chris Lamica as Second Worker

Production

Development
Aaron and Billy wrote the screenplay for the film in 2011, about an old American poet named Eugene. Talking about the film they said that "(it is) an ensemble film that spans three major different times in Eugene's life." They further talked about the character of Eugene "His wife is dead, his daughter can't stand him, and he doesn't have many friends."

They also chose to shoot scenes at The Frost Place, the museum and former home of late American poet Robert Frost. They explained their reasons for filming at The Frost Place by saying that "The Frost Place was an exciting natural step because our main character is a poet and has many similarities to Frost, there's so much art and creativity in this area."

Casting
Talking about the casting Aaron and Billy said that they spend so much time on script that they knew exactly which actor they wanted for the particular role. They explained that "There was a feeling, when we got to casting we just knew who could and couldn't fit this or that role." David Warner was selected to play the role of older Eugene, the directors knew from the start that he was perfect for the role. Billy said about his casting that "David was amazing, to see in the space, among the woods in New England was incredible. Without him we wouldn't have this movie. Maybe he'll finally get knighted for this."

Filming
Filming was done in the New England region of the United States, starting on 22 June 2012, in Vermont, then later moving to Franconia, New Hampshire, and ended in August 2012.

Promotion
On 10 June 2013 a few second clip of scene featuring Eugene Simon and Bonnie Wright was released online. In November 2014, first official trailer of the film was released.

References

External links

Iambic Media
Before I Sleep Pdf kit

2013 films
2013 drama films
American drama films
Films shot in New Hampshire
Films shot in Vermont
American independent films
2013 independent films
2010s English-language films
2010s American films